Daniel Skirka is an American college baseball coach and former shortstop. Skirka is the head coach of the Murray State Racers baseball team.

Playing career
Skirka attended Union City High School in Union City, Michigan. Skirka played for the school's varsity baseball team three years, while also playing basketball for four years. Skirka then enrolled at the Kellogg Community College, to play college baseball for the Kellogg Bruins baseball team.

As a freshman at Kellogg Community College in 2004, Skirka had a .273 batting average with 8 RBIs.

As a sophomore in 2005, Skirka batted .358 with 2 home runs, and 35 RBIs.

In the 2006 season as a junior, Skirka accepted a scholarship offer to Grand Valley State University. Skirka won the starting shortstop job for the Lakers. He hit scored 56 runs, while hitting .322 with a .432 on-base percentage (OBP) and 28 RBIs.

Skirka had his best season as a senior in 2007, hitting a career high in doubles (14), triples (5), home runs (7), RBIs (43), batting average (.400) and slugging (.631). He was named First Team All-Great Lakes Intercollegiate Athletic Conference, Rawlings/American Baseball Coaches Association (ABCA) All-Region honors and a CoSIDA Academica All-Region selection.

Coaching career
In 2008, Skirka began his coaching career as an assistant at Grand Rapids Community College. In 2009, Skirka was named an assistant for the Ouachita Baptist University. In 2010, Skirka moved on to Murray State University as an assistant coach. Skirka spent two seasons as the first base coach, before moving to third base coach and working with outfielders and hitters. In 2015, Skirka became the recruiting coordinator for the Walters State Community College baseball team.

On July 2, 2018, Skirka returned to Murray State as the head coach of the baseball program.

Head coaching record

See also
 List of current NCAA Division I baseball coaches

References

External links
Grand Valley State Lakers bio
Murray State Racers bio

Living people
Baseball shortstops
Kellogg Bruins baseball players
Grand Valley State Lakers baseball players
Grand Rapids Raiders baseball coaches
Ouachita Baptist Tigers baseball coaches
Murray State Racers baseball coaches
Walters State Senators baseball coaches
1985 births
Murray State University alumni